Shrimant Balasaheb Patil is an Indian politician. He was elected to the Karnataka Legislative Assembly from Kagwad in the 2018 Karnataka Legislative Assembly election as a member of the Indian National Congress. He was one among the 17 Congress and JD(S) legislators who withdrew their support to the H.D.Kumaraswamy government in 2019. He was disqualified from his position as legislator and later joined the Bharatiya Janata Party. He won reelection from Kagwad and was inducted into the ministry of B. S. Yediyurappa in 2020. However, he was not included into the Council of ministers when Basavaraj Bommai became Chief minister.

Education
He completed SSLC (10th Standard) from Shri Siddeshwara High School, Mole which is affiliated to Karnataka Secondary Education Examination Board, Bangalore in 1970. Later he did B.Sc graduation from College of Agriculture, Kolhapur (affiliated to Mahatma Phule Krishi Vidyapeeth, Rahuri) in 1974.

References

1963 births
Living people
Janata Dal (Secular) politicians
Bharatiya Janata Party politicians from Karnataka
Indian National Congress politicians from Karnataka
People from Belgaum
Karnataka MLAs 2018–2023